Kalmora, or The Paternal Right of the Americans is a Polish-language opera (melodrama) in 2 acts by Karol Kurpiński. The libretto was written by Kazimierz Brodziński. Its first performance took place on 10 March 1820.

The complete score of the overture was published by Breitkopf & Härtel in Leipzig in 1825 or 1826 as Kurpiński's Opus 14.

References

External links 
 
 , conducted by Witold Rowicki

1820 operas
Operas by Karol Kurpiński
Polish-language operas
Operas